Katharine Hope McPhee (born March 25, 1984) is an American singer-songwriter and actress. In May 2006, she rose to fame as the runner-up on the fifth season of American Idol. 

Her eponymous debut album was released on RCA Records on January 30, 2007, and debuted at number two on the Billboard 200, selling 381,000 copies (as of December 2010). The album's first single, "Over It", was a Pop Top 30 hit and was certified gold in 2008. Her second album, Unbroken, was released on Verve Forecast Records on January 5, 2010, and debuted at No. 27 on the "Billboard 200". The album featured the single "Had It All", which peaked at number 22 on the AC chart. It has sold 45,000 copies as of January 2011.

Her third album, the holiday-themed Christmas Is the Time to Say I Love You, was released on October 12, 2010. The album debuted at number 11 on the Billboard Top Holiday Albums chart, while the single "Have Yourself a Merry Little Christmas" peaked at number 16 on the "Billboard" AC chart. As of January 2011, this album had sold 23,000 copies. McPhee released her fourth album, Hysteria, on September 18, 2015. She released her fifth album, I Fall in Love Too Easily, composed of jazz standards, on November 17, 2017.

McPhee has also established an acting career, co-starring in The House Bunny and Shark Night 3D. She played Karen Cartwright, one of the lead roles on Smash. From 2014 to 2018, she starred in CBS' Scorpion as Paige Dineen.

She made her Broadway debut in the musical Waitress, taking over the role of Jenna in 2018 and again in 2019-2020 and also starred in the role in London's West End in 2019.

Early life
McPhee was born in Los Angeles, California. Her father, Daniel McPhee, was a television producer. Her mother, Peisha (née Burch) McPhee, has been a vocal coach on American Idol since 2011. The family moved to the Sherman Oaks neighborhood of Los Angeles when she was 12 years old. Peisha McPhee recognized her daughter's musical talent and decided to train her. McPhee's older sister, Adriana, has been a vocal coach on American Idol since 2012. McPhee is of English, Irish, Scottish, and German descent.

She attended Boston Conservatory for three semesters, majoring in musical theatre. She left college before graduation on the advice of her manager, and returned to Los Angeles to try out for television pilots. McPhee was cast (during the time she had dropped out of college and was auditioning in Los Angeles) in a mall-based MTV soap opera pilot, You Are Here, playing the older sister of a more popular younger sister. MTV never aired the pilot and did not pick up the series.

In March 2005, McPhee starred as Annie Oakley in a Cabrillo Music Theater production of the musical Annie Get Your Gun. McPhee was nominated for a Los Angeles Stage Ovation Award in the category of "Lead Actress in a Musical". McPhee had a small role as Paramount Girl in the 2007 musical film Crazy, based on the life of Hank Garland. McPhee filmed the role in early 2005, before she auditioned for American Idol.

McPhee has struggled with eating disorders. She told People that at age 13, she began starving herself and exercising compulsively, and at age 17, became bulimic. McPhee gained weight in college due to her bingeing. After seven years of illness, she finally entered a three-month rehabilitation program after successfully passing her American Idol audition; her rehab stint ended just before the Idol semifinals started in February 2006. During her run on American Idol, she lost  due to eating better as part of her treatment.

She told Teen Vogue in May 2007, "I eat whatever I crave—I'm just really careful about portions." McPhee and her sister appeared on the debut of The Dr. Keith Ablow Show on September 18, 2006, to discuss her struggles with bulimia and her childhood fear of her father.

Career

American Idol

In 2005, McPhee was persuaded by eventual husband Nick Cokas and her parents to try out for the television series competition American Idol. She auditioned in San Francisco and sang "God Bless the Child", originally performed by Billie Holiday, and was selected to be a participant in the fifth season, which aired in 2006. After the first round of Hollywood week, she sang "I'll Never Love This Way Again" by Dionne Warwick, which earned favorable comments from the judges. During the second round, she performed in a group, singing "I Can't Help Myself (Sugar Pie Honey Bunch)" by the Four Tops, forgetting the words, but the judges decided to advance the entire group. During the third round, she sang "My Funny Valentine" a cappella and advanced to the top 40. She was angered when fellow group member Crystal Stark did not make the top 24. McPhee's run on American Idol led to the use of the term "McPheever". The inclusion of producer David Foster and singer Andrea Bocelli as guest mentors for Top 6 Week turned out to be a fortuitous introduction for McPhee, as she has worked on various music projects with both men after Idol. In May 2006, McPhee visited her alma mater Notre Dame High School for her hometown celebration. Mayor Antonio Villaraigosa visited the school and proclaimed the day Katharine McPhee Day. She finished as the runner-up to Taylor Hicks.

Performances and results (during voting weeks)

 When Ryan Seacrest announced the results that night, McPhee was placed in the top two.
 When Ryan Seacrest announced the results that night, McPhee was in the bottom two but declared safe when Chris Daughtry was eliminated.

2006–08: Katharine McPhee and feature-film debut
On June 6, 2006, Sony BMG announced that McPhee had signed to American Idol series creator Simon Fuller's 19 Recordings Limited and Sony BMG's RCA Records. Also in June, McPhee performed at the J.C. Penney Jam: Concert for America's Kids, soloing with "Somewhere Over the Rainbow" and performing a duet with Andrea Bocelli on "Somos Novios".

McPhee's Idol single, "Somewhere Over the Rainbow/My Destiny" was released on June 27, 2006, by RCA Records. "Somewhere Over the Rainbow" peaked at number 12 on the Billboard Hot 100 and "My Destiny" peaked at number 60. 32 weeks after its release, Somewhere Over the Rainbow/My Destiny had climbed to number four on the Billboard Hot Singles Sales charts. It was the second-highest best-selling single of 2006 after Taylor Hicks' "Do I Make You Proud". "Somewhere Over the Rainbow/My Destiny" remained on the chart for more than 58 weeks.

In July, McPhee missed the first three weeks of the American Idol Tour due to laryngitis and bronchitis. She joined the tour beginning with the July 28 show in Washington, DC, singing only two songs "Over the Rainbow" and "Black Horse and the Cherry Tree", instead of the usual four, on doctor's orders to conserve her voice. At the August 1 concert in Charlotte, North Carolina, McPhee suffered a hairline fracture of her foot when she tripped backstage and was fitted with a walking-boot cast. Once she recovered from the foot injury, she added "Think" to her concert set.

McPhee recorded a duet with Andrea Bocelli on "Can't Help Falling in Love" for his Under the Desert Sky album, which was released as a CD/DVD package on November 7, 2006.

McPhee signed a two-year endorsement deal in 2006 with Sexy Hair Concepts to become their first celebrity spokesperson for their hair-care product line. Also in 2006, McPhee founded a charity called McPhee Outreach. The purpose of the charity is to team up with other foundations or organizations and help in any way possible. The foundation teamed up with the Lollipop Theater Network to provide music outreach (called "Rhythm of Hope") to sick children in Southern California hospitals. McPhee Outreach teamed up with Global Compassion Services to build a preschool in the West African nation of Burkina Faso to help combat that nation's high illiteracy rate.

On December 1, 2006, McPhee released "A Gift to You / O Come All Ye Faithful". The single was conceived and co-produced by Al Gomes of Big Noise, along with Walter Afanasieff. McPhee performed "O Come All Ye Faithful" on the TNT Network special Christmas in Washington, DC.

McPhee's self-titled debut album, Katharine McPhee was released on January 30, 2007, and sold 116,000 copies its first week, debuting at number two on the Billboard 200 Albums Chart. The first single from the album was "Over It" peaked at number 29 on the Billboard Hot 100. The second single, "Love Story" failed to crack the Billboard Hot 100.

In early 2007, McPhee guest-starred in the web series, lonelygirl15 as an unnamed character in the episode "Truth or Dare". McPhee made a cameo appearance as herself on Ugly Betty in the episode "I'm Coming Out". The episode was broadcast February 1, 2007. During the 2007 Christmas holiday season, McPhee released a Christmas single "O Come All Ye Faithful".

On January 11, 2008, Billboard.com reported that McPhee had been released from her contract with RCA Records. A spokesperson for the label stated, "She is going to record her next album on her own."

McPhee signed a two-year endorsement deal with Neutrogena to become the new spokesperson for their anti-acne skin-care product line. In March 2008, she filmed her first commercial, which began airing on television in May 2008 and on Neutrogena's skinid.com website. McPhee appeared on American Idol judge Randy Jackson's album Randy Jackson's Music Club, Vol. 1, which was released on March 11, 2008. McPhee recorded a duet of "Real Love" with fellow American Idol 5 contestant Elliott Yamin. On March 12, 2008, McPhee returned to the American Idol stage during the Top 12 results night of the seventh season of the competition. She performed the Beatles song "Something", with producer David Foster, on piano. After the performance, Foster indicated that McPhee and he were collaborating on her second studio album (though it ended up he was not part of the finished product). McPhee took part in the David Foster tribute concert Hit Man: David Foster & Friends, which was filmed by PBS, in May 2008. She soloed on "Somewhere" and performed a duet of "The Prayer" with Andrea Bocelli. A CD/DVD was released in November 2008. Foster recorded "I Will Be There With You" for Japan Airlines (JAL), with McPhee on vocals. Starting in June 2008, it was used to promote the introduction of new aircraft to JAL's US flights.

McPhee made her studio-acting debut in the comedy The House Bunny, co-starring as one of the few members of a misfit sorority. The movie, released in August 2008, starred Anna Faris as a Playboy Bunny who took the girls under her wing. It was directed by Fred Wolf for Columbia Pictures and produced by Adam Sandler's Happy Madison Productions. McPhee released a cover of the song "I Know What Boys Like", featuring the other cast members of the movie 'The House Bunny'. In September 2008, McPhee took part in Chris Botti's concert, which was filmed by PBS in Boston. She sang "I've Got You Under My Skin" accompanied by Botti on trumpet. The concert was shown several times on PBS starting in January 2009. A live album, Chris Botti in Boston, was released on March 31, 2009, on CD/DVD and Blu-ray.

2009–10: Unbroken, TV shows, and movie projects
It was announced on January 27, 2009, that McPhee had signed a record deal with Verve Forecast Records (part of the Verve Music Group under Universal Music Group).

McPhee guest-starred on CSI: NY in the episode "Prey" as a singer and stalker victim who murdered her stalker. The episode was broadcast April 8, 2009. In September 2009, McPhee took part in the United Negro College Fund's "An Evening of Stars" concert that was a tribute to singer-songwriter Lionel Richie. McPhee sang You Are. The concert was broadcast in syndication and on BET the weekend of January 23–24, 2010. A two-disc DVD of the concert was available for a time through a donation to the United Negro College Fund. McPhee joined actresses Alyson Hannigan, Jaime King, Minka Kelly, and Emily Deschanel in a video slumber party made available in October 2009 and featured on FunnyorDie.com and other Internet platforms in a comedic take to promote regular breast-cancer screenings for the organization Stand Up to Cancer. A Christmas single "I'll Be Home for Christmas" was released November 17, 2009.

McPhee's second album Unbroken was released January 5, 2010, and debuted at number 27 on the Billboard 200 chart, selling 15,000 copies its first week. For her second effort, McPhee worked with producer John Alagia. The first single from the album, "Had It All", was released to McPhee's MySpace page on August 25, 2009.

McPhee appeared on the Jan 19, 2010, episode of The Biggest Loser, McPhee was shown volunteering at a Los Angeles food bank and meeting with children at a Boys and Girls Club and talking about the importance of helping to fight hunger in America. On February 1, 2010, McPhee joined over 75 other musicians, including fellow American Idol alumni Jennifer Hudson and Jordin Sparks and American Idol judge Randy Jackson, for a remake of "We Are the World", retitled "We Are the World 25 for Haiti", which marked the 25th anniversary of the iconic song and for which proceeds will go to Haitian earthquake relief.

During the week of February 8, 2010, in the taped Hollywood Week portion of the ninth season of American Idol, contestant Didi Benami was shown singing "Terrified", a song on the Unbroken album and written by Idol judge Kara DioGuardi. As a result of the exposure, digital downloads of the song (the album version featuring Jason Reeves) rose nearly 10 times from the week before, selling about 20,000 copies for the week, for a total of 22,000 sold at that point. On February 22, 2010, McPhee appeared in the production of 110 Stories, directed by Mark Freiburger at the Geffen Playhouse in Los Angeles. She co-starred alongside Ed Asner, Diane Venora, Gail O'Grady, John Hawkes, Malcolm-Jamal Warner, and many others. The play was a benefit to help the victims of the recent Haiti earthquake. Proceeds went to the Red Cross of Greater Los Angeles. On March 9, 2010, McPhee performed "Surrender" at the White House, in front of President Obama and the First Lady as part of International Women's Day. McPhee guest-starred on Community in the episode "Basic Genealogy" as Chevy Chase's character's ex-stepdaughter and potential love interest for Joel McHale's character. The episode was broadcast March 11, 2010.

In April 2010, McPhee made a TV pilot for The Pink House. McPhee played Emily, a down-to-earth Midwestern girl new to Manhattan Beach, Los Angeles. The pilot was shot as a possible pickup for the Fall 2010 season and was produced by Conan O'Brien's production company, with O'Brien as executive producer. Shooting took place April 9, 2010. NBC did not pick up the pilot.

On May 4, 2010, a new version of the Unbroken song "Terrified" featuring actor Zachary Levi premiered on Entertainment Weekly'''s website and was made available for purchase on iTunes. The accompanying music video premiered on May 7, 2010, on the music video website Vevo. In the summer of 2010, McPhee partnered with Feeding America and ConAgra Foods Foundation to help launch the Hunger-Free Summer Initiative, which aimed to help children at risk of hunger during the summer months. Throughout the month of July, McPhee traveled around the country to various Feeding America food banks to raise awareness.

McPhee released a Christmas album titled Christmas Is the Time to Say I Love You on October 12, 2010. The album debuted at number 11 on the Billboard Top Holiday Albums chart and sold 1,000 copies in its first week. One of the Christmas album's songs "Have Yourself a Merry Little Christmas" was released to radio in November 2010 and peaked at number 16 on the Billboard Adult Contemporary Chart. Country singer Chelsea Field's song "Love's Never Leavin'", a song that McPhee co-wrote with singer-songwriter Richard Marx and producer Trey Bruce, was made available for purchase on iTunes on November 9, 2010, with 100% of the proceeds to benefit the Tammany Humane Society in Covington, LA. On December 15, 2010, St. Jude Children's Research Hospital released a video on their website for their Thanks and Giving Campaign that featured McPhee interacting with sick children at the hospital with her song "Lifetime" playing over the soundtrack.

2011–2013: Smash series and new record deal
In February 2011,  McPhee was announced as having landed a starring role in the TV pilot Smash, also starring Debra Messing, Megan Hilty, Jack Davenport, Anjelica Huston, Christian Borle, and Brian d'Arcy James. In May 2011, NBC picked up Smash as a series. The series, set as a musical drama, follows a group of characters who come together to put on a Broadway musical inspired by Marilyn Monroe.

On June 9, 2011, McPhee was announced to have signed a record deal with Columbia Records (a label under Sony Music Entertainment), in conjunction with Columbia teaming with NBC to distribute the music for Smash. In July 2011, Forbes reported that McPhee was number 10 on their list of the 10 top-earning American Idol performers (she was tied with David Archuleta and David Cook), earning $1 million (pretax estimates before subtracting manager and agent fees) for music and acting endeavors for the period May 2010 to May 2011.

McPhee co-starred in director David Ellis' shark thriller indie film Shark Night 3D, which was released September 2, 2011."Actors Feed 'Shark Night 3-D'", Variety.

In December 2011, McPhee became a spokesperson for the Malaria No More organization to help raise awareness about the campaign to eradicate malaria.

NBC debuted Smash in midseason 2011–12 on February 6, 2012, to generally favorable reviews, scoring a 79 out of 100 on Metacritic. On March 26, 2012, Smash was renewed for a second season. McPhee recorded a voice-over for Family Guy, for the episode "You Can't Do That on Television, Peter", playing the voice of Mother Maggie. The episode was broadcast April 1, 2012.

McPhee had a cameo role as a singer performing at a festival for the feature film Peace, Love & Misunderstanding, which starred Jane Fonda and was filmed in upstate New York. McPhee filmed her cameo in September 2010. The film was out as a limited release on June 8, 2012.

In early 2009, McPhee was cast in a lead role in the independent $6 million romantic-comedy You May Not Kiss the Bride, which was filmed in Hawaii. McPhee played the role of Masha, alongside Dave Annable. The film debuted at the 14th Annual Sonoma International Film Festival that was held April 6–10, 2011 The film was released theatrically in the US in late 2012, premiering August 29, 2012, in Hawaii and September 21, 2012, in several mainland markets including Chicago, Dallas, and Los Angeles, as well as Video On Demand, iTunes, and Amazon. One of the songs included in the movie was co-written by McPhee.

In January 2013, Forbes reported that McPhee again made their list of the 10 top-earning American Idol performers (she was tied with Kellie Pickler at number seven), earning $1.1 million (pretax estimates before subtracting manager and agent fees) for music and acting endeavors for the period May 2011 to May 2012.

On March 28, 2013, McPhee returned to the American Idol stage to perform on the 12th season top-eight results show with OneRepublic, where she lent guest vocals to the group's latest single, "If I Lose Myself".

By April 2013, McPhee had begun recording her fourth studio album, then scheduled for release in late 2013 and featuring songwriting collaborations with Ryan Tedder, Linda Perry, and Sia. Smash was cancelled that same year, after two seasons. In August 2013, McPhee indicated in an interview for an upcoming concert that she hoped to see the album released in 2014.

2014–2017: Scorpion and Hysteria
In January 2014, Forbes reported that McPhee again made their list of the 10 top-earners (tied with Jennifer Hudson at number 10), this time for 2013, earning $1 million (pretax estimates before subtracting manager and agent fees) for music and acting endeavors for the period May 2012 to May 2013.

In November and December 2013, McPhee filmed a Hallmark Hall of Fame movie in Vancouver, British Columbia, called In My Dreams. Directed by Kenny Leon, it stars McPhee and Mike Vogel as two people searching for love and meeting in their dreams. The movie was broadcast on April 20, 2014.

On March 17, 2014, a press release announced that McPhee would star as Paige in Scorpion. CBS picked up the show on May 9, 2014, and it premiered September 22.

McPhee guest-starred with fellow Smash actor Megan Hilty on the Wesley Taylor web series It Could Be Worse. McPhee and Hilty filmed the roles in January 2014 and the episode premiered with the second season on Hulu in July 2014.

McPhee said in interviews for Scorpion, including one to the L.A. Times in September 2014, that her fourth album had been put on hold due to Scorpion being picked up and that some realigning would occur as far as where the music fits.

CBS debuted Scorpion on September 22, 2014, as part of the 2014–15 fall TV season. The pilot received generally mixed reviews from critics. On Metacritic, it received a score of 48/100 from 19 critics, indicating mixed or average reviews. The pilot earned 13.83 million viewers and a 3.2 in the 18–49 demographic. McPhee covered the Frankie Valli song "Can't Take My Eyes Off You" in the episode "Risky Business".

On November 5, 2014, McPhee was a presenter for the 2015 People's Choice Awards nominations announcement.

McPhee performed on the 16th annual A Home For the Holidays adoption special that was broadcast on December 19, 2014. This was her second appearance on the annual special.

On January 7, 2015, McPhee was a presenter at the 2015 People's Choice Awards, where she introduced a performance by Lady Antebellum.

On January 18, McPhee sang the national anthem before the NFC Championship Game in Seattle. On January 26, she co-hosted with sports analyst Boomer Esiason the 2015 Greatest Super Bowl Commercials special. On February 8, McPhee was a presenter at the 2015 Grammy Awards on CBS, where she introduced a performance of Tony Bennett and Lady Gaga.

On April 9, 2015, McPhee posted a photo on Instagram, teasing about the upcoming music video of the first single from her fourth album. "Lick My Lips", written by Florence and the Machine member Isabella Summers, was released on May 26. The track list of Hysteria has been revealed with one song written by Ryan Tedder and another song written by Sia Furler. On August 14, "Stranger than Fiction", a song co-written by Ryan Tedder and McPhee, was released. On August 28, "Love Strikes" was released on iTunes. Hysteria, McPhee's fourth studio album was released as scheduled on September 18, 2015.

On December 6, Katharine performed "You Make Me Feel So Young" and with John Legend on "You and Me (We Wanted It All)" on the Sinatra 100: An All-Star Grammy Concert.

McPhee returned to American Idol on March 24, 2016, and performed "Somewhere Over the Rainbow". She returned for the fifteenth season finale on April 7, where she performed a short version of "Need You Now" with Casey James as part of an acoustic medley.

McPhee appeared on Lip Sync Battle on April 7, 2016, where she performed against Jason Derulo and won.

On September 18, 2015, McPhee independently released her fourth album, Hysteria, composed of pop originals.

In December 2016, McPhee performed as the opening act at several stops on Andrea Bocelli's tour.

On February 12, 2017, McPhee was a presenter with The Chainsmokers at the 59th Annual Grammy Awards.

On April 16, 2017, CBS broadcast the concert Stayin' Alive: A Grammy's Salute to the Music of the Bee Gees, where McPhee performed "Emotion".

In June 2017, McPhee began filming the independent film Louisiana Cavier in New Orleans.

2017–2021: I Fall in Love Too Easily and Waitress 
On November 4, 2017, McPhee starred in the Lifetime TV movie The Lost Wife of Robert Durst in the role of Robert Durst's first wife Kathie.I Fall in Love Too Easily, a collection of romantic standards, was released on November 17, 2017, via BMG. The first single, "Night and Day", was made available for free via streaming.

McPhee took over the lead female role of Jenna in Waitress as her Broadway debut. She began performances on April 10, 2018, and played the role through August 19, 2018.

On May 11, 2018, the song "Living in the Moment" was released. Carole Bayer Sager shared in a Twitter post that it was written by her, Jay Landers and Walter Afanasieff as the theme for the movie Book Club.McPhee played the lead role Jenna again in Waitress at the Adelphi Theatre in London's West End in March through June 2019. She returned to the Broadway production on November 25, 2019, and remained with the show until its final performance on January 5, 2020. In 2021, she plays Bailey in Country Comfort.Also in 2021, Katharine McPhee and David Foster competed in season six of The Masked Singer as "Banana Split" in which McPhee dressed up as the ice cream half who did all the singing and Foster dressed up as the banana half who did the instrument playing and conducting. They were eliminated in the Group B Finale.

 2022-Present: Christmas Songs and jewelry line 
McPhee and her husband David Foster recorded a Christmas EP called Christmas Songs, composed of seven songs. The first single "Jingle Bell Rock" was released digitally on October 28, 2022. The EP was released on November 25 2022.

Also in 2022, McPhee released a jewelry line called KMF Jewelry in early November 2022.

Personal life
After dating for three years, on February 2, 2008, McPhee married Nick Cokas at Beverly Hills Presbyterian Church. In October 2013, she was photographed publicly kissing her married Smash director, Michael Morris. On May 22, 2014, McPhee filed for divorce from Cokas, after "having been separated for the past year". Her divorce from Cokas was finalized on February 8, 2016.

McPhee dated her Scorpion co-star Elyes Gabel for almost two years. They split in 2016.

She became engaged to record producer David Foster in June 2018. They married a year later on June 28, 2019, at the St. Yeghiche Armenian Apostolic Church in Kensington, London. She gave birth to a son named Rennie David Foster on February 22, 2021. On Katherine Schwarzenegger's Instagram Live series, Before, During & After Baby, McPhee described struggling with her mental health after gaining weight during her pregnancy.

McPhee has donated to Republican political candidates, including Donald Trump.

Discography

 Katharine McPhee (2007)
 Unbroken (2010)
 Christmas Is the Time to Say I Love You (2010)
 Hysteria (2015)
 I Fall in Love Too Easily'' (2017)

Filmography

Film

Television

Stage

Awards and nominations

References

External links

 
 
 
 
 
 
 
 

1984 births
Living people
19 Recordings artists
21st-century American actresses
21st-century American singers
21st-century American women singers
Actresses from Los Angeles
American women pop singers
American women singer-songwriters
American film actresses
American Idol participants
American people of German descent
American people of Irish descent
American people of Scottish descent
American television actresses
Boston Conservatory at Berklee alumni
California Republicans
Columbia Records artists
Musicians from Los Angeles
People from Sherman Oaks, Los Angeles
RCA Records artists
Singer-songwriters from California
Verve Forecast Records artists